The 1945 Argentine Film Critics Association Awards ceremony was held in Buenos Aires on 4 January 1945  to honour the best films and contributors to Argentine cinema in 1944.

Awards given
Best Film  (Mejor Película): Su mejor alumno 
Best Director  (Mejor Director): Lucas Demare for Su mejor alumno
Best Actor  (Mejor Actor): Enrique Muiño for Su mejor alumno
Best Actress  (Mejor Actriz): Mirtha Legrand for La pequeña señora de Pérez
Best Actor in a Comic Role  (Mejor Actor Cómico): Pepe Iglesias for Mi novia es un fantasma
Best Supporting Actor  (Mejor Actor de Reparto): Sebastián Chiola for The Corpse Breaks a Date (El muerto falta a la cita)
Best Supporting Actress  (Mejor Actriz de Reparto): Elsa O'Connor for El deseo 
Best Original Screenplay (Mejor Guión Original): Roberto Talice, Eliseo Montaine for Centauros del pasado
Best Adapted Screenplay (Mejor Guión Adaptado): Ulises Petit de Murat, Homero Manzi for  Su mejor alumno
Best Cinematography (Mejor Fotografía): Adolfo W. Slazy for Pachamama
Best Sound (Mejor Sonido): Mario Fezia for 24 horas en la vida de una mujer
Best Music (Mejor Music): Alejandro Gutiérrez del Barrio for Pachamama
Best Camera Operator (Mejor Càmara): Humberto Peruzzi for Su mejor alumno
Best Foreign Film (Mejor Película Extranjera): Leo McCarey's Going My Way (1944)

References

External links
1945 Argentinean Film Critics Association Awards at the Internet Movie Database

Argentine Film Critics Association Awards ceremonies
1945 in Argentina
1944 film awards